Heiligendamm is a German seaside resort founded in 1793. 

It is the oldest seaside spa in continental Europe. Heiligendamm is part of the town Bad Doberan in the state of Mecklenburg-Vorpommern and historically belongs to Mecklenburg.

The cluster of resort architecture mansions and spa buildings at the seafront are reminders of the glory days when this part of the Baltic Sea was one of the playgrounds of Europe's aristocracy. Due to the classicist white buildings lining the beach promenade, the town is also known as the "White Pearl" or the "White Town by the Sea".

Today, the area by the sea is occupied by a five-star hotel, the Grand Hotel Heiligendamm. A narrow-gauge steam railway, known as the "Molli", links Heiligendamm with Kühlungsborn and Bad Doberan.

History

Heiligendamm was developed as an elegant meeting place for the nobility and high society. Among its most prominent guests were the German Emperors.

Its founder and first guest in 1793 was the Grand Duke of Mecklenburg Friedrich Franz I; he made the resort fashionable. Between 1793 and 1870, Johann Christoph, Heinrich von Seydwitz, Carl Theodor Severin, and Gustav Adolph Demmler created a veritable Gesamtkunstwerk for bathing and lodging. Heiligendamm was always regarded as the most elegant seaside resort in Germany. Nobility from throughout Europe used it as a summer getaway well into the 20th century.

After the Second World War, the buildings of Heiligendamm were used as sanatoria and recovery ward. When Mecklenburg became part of the communist GDR, some of Heiligendamm's famous buildings were demolished and replaced by more utilitarian structures. After the German reunification in 1989/1990, a group of investors bought most of the buildings and undertook a major programme of refurbishment. 

A new company, the Kempinski Grand Hotel, opened in spring of 2003 – it used six historical buildings including the historical Kurhaus at the beach of Heiligendamm. The development has led to some conflict with residents, as main streets and cycle paths have been removed or rerouted. Also again a famous building of the ensemble was demolished. The mansion next to the Grand Hotel was reconstructed until 2011, though. Renovations of other mansions are undergoing or planned.

On July 13, 2006, United States President George W. Bush stayed at Heiligendamm while on a state visit to see German Chancellor Angela Merkel in Stralsund.

On June 6 to 8, 2007, Heiligendamm's Grand Hotel hosted the 33rd summit of G8 leaders. During this time, thousands of anticapitalist activists from around the world blocked the roads to Heiligendamm and an estimated 25,000 anti-globalization protesters demonstrated in nearby Rostock.

In July 2013, the Grand Hotel Heiligendamm was bought by Hannover-based accountant Paul Morzynski, who intends to carefully extend and reorganize the hotel.

Sights 

The resort architecture near the beaches of Heiligendamm, consisting of classicist and historicist mansions and spa buildings, is part of a unique heritage, as the first such buildings of the European continent can be seen here. The area of the Grand Hotel is partly accessible to visitors, but should be experienced respectfully to not disturb the hotel guests.

The narrow gauge railway known as Bäderbahn Molli ("Molli Resort Railway") runs through Heiligendamm from Kühlungsborn to Bad Doberan. The line between Bad Doberan and Heiligendamm was built in 1886. The Protestant Forest Church (Evangelische Waldkirche) was renovated after die Wende, the Catholic Church of the Sacred Heart (Herz-Jesu-Kapelle) is close by.

Heiligendamm also has a 200-metre-long pier into the Baltic Sea that allows great views of the White Pearl Mansions at the beach.

Images

Literature 
in English language
 Charles James Apperley: "Nimrods German Tour" – a travel through northern Germany, especially to Heiligendamm in 1828. Publishing company: Godewind Verlag, Germany 2006. 

in German language
 Hans Thielcke: Die Bauten des Seebades Doberan - Heiligendamm um 1800 und Ihr Baumeister Severin. Godewind Verlag, 2004  . (Reprint d. Originalausgabe von 1917)
 Friedrich Compart: Geschichte des Klosters Doberan. Godewind Verlag, 2004. . (Reprint der Originalausgabe von 1872)
 Heinrich Hesse: Die Geschichte von Doberan-Heiligendamm. Godewind Verlag, Wismar 2004, . (Bearbeitete Neuauflage der Originalausgabe von 1838)
 Adolf Nizze: Doberan-Heiligendamm: Geschichte des ersten deutschen Seebades. Godewind Verlag, Wismar 2004, . (Bearbeitete Neuauflage der Originalausgabe von 1823)
 Die Reise eines Gesunden in die Seebäder Swinemünde, Putbus und Doberan. Godewind Verlag, Wismar 2005, . (Bearbeitete Neuauflage der Originalausgabe von 1823)
 Hans-Jürgen Herbst: Kalender 2007, Doberan & Heiligendamm, erstes deutsches Seebad. Godewind Verlag, 2007, .
 Dr. Samuel G. Vogel: Allgemeine Baderegeln zum Gebrauche für Badelustige überhaupt und diejenigen insbesondere, welche sich des Seebades in Doberan bedienen. Godewind Verlag, 2004, . (Bearbeitete Neuauflage der Originalausgabe von 1817)

See also
 List of G8 summit resorts
Zingst

References

External links

 Heiligendamm official website 

Seaside resorts in Germany
Villages in Mecklenburg-Western Pomerania
Populated places established in 1793
Bad Doberan
Populated coastal places in Germany (Baltic Sea)
Resort architecture in Mecklenburg